Wang Fan (born 27 January 1994) is a Chinese beach volleyball player. She competed alongside Yue Yuan in the women's beach volleyball tournament at the 2016 Summer Olympics.

References

External links
 
 
 
 

1994 births
Living people
Sportspeople from Hebei
Chinese female beach volleyball players
Beach volleyball players at the 2016 Summer Olympics
Olympic beach volleyball players of China
Asian Games gold medalists for China
Asian Games bronze medalists for China
Asian Games medalists in beach volleyball
Beach volleyball players at the 2014 Asian Games
Beach volleyball players at the 2018 Asian Games
Medalists at the 2014 Asian Games
Medalists at the 2018 Asian Games
Beach volleyball players at the 2020 Summer Olympics
21st-century Chinese women